Tiny Ruins are a musical ensemble from Auckland, New Zealand.

History
Tiny Ruins began as an alias for singer-songwriter Hollie Fullbrook, who recorded as a solo artist prior to 2009. Fullbrook recorded an EP with singer-songwriter Lieven Scheerlink in 2010 under the name Tiny Ruins and toured Europe for the first time with him and Ana Franco from Coffee & Wine. In 2011, she recorded the full-length Some Were Meant for Sea. She then opened for Fleet Foxes and toured internationally with Calexico and Beach House. After adding Cass Basil and Alexander Freer to the lineup, Tiny Ruins recorded a second album, Brightly Painted One, which was released in 2014. Guitarist Tom Healy and violinist Siobhanne Thompson performed on the album and appeared with the group on subsequent tours. Brightly Painted One was awarded Best Alternative Album at the New Zealand Music Awards in November 2014.

In 2016, Fullbrook teamed up with Hamish Kilgour and former Terrorways, Gary Havoc & The Hurricanes  drummer Gary Hunt for the Hurtling Through release.

Discography

References

Indie folk groups
Musical groups from Auckland
Bella Union artists
Flying Nun Records artists